Los Angeles SWAT (also known as L.A. SWAT) is a 1986 video game released by Mastertronic for the Amstrad CPC, Atari 8-bit family, Commodore 64, and ZX Spectrum. In this game, the player assumed the role of a Los Angeles police officer fighting rioters. In each level, the player would move toward the top of the screen avoiding or shooting the rioters, who would either lob grenades, if at a distance, or beat your character to the pavement with clubs if in melee range.

At the end of each level, a procession of gang members (usually with a single shirt color, marching in formation) would stream down from the top of the screen. After killing all of these gang members, a single gang member, the boss, would move randomly around the screen with a woman next to him. This functioned a bit like a sharpshooting competition, as shooting the woman would cause the player to lose points, while successfully shooting only the ganger would cause her to "take the arm" of your character.

As the levels progress, the gangers become more frequent and the player will begin to see cars placed perpendicular to the street, acting as roadblocks.

The Commodore 64 and Atari 8-bit versions share a disk with Panther, another Mastertronic game. The one side of the disk contains the two programs for the C64, while the other has Atari 8-bit versions.

Reception
Zzap!64 found the game to be in dubious taste yet undoubtedly enjoyable to play, despite the poor graphics and sound.  It was given an overall rating of 74%.

References

External links

1986 video games
Amstrad CPC games
Atari 8-bit family games
Commodore 64 games
Video games about police officers
Video games developed in the United States
ZX Spectrum games
Mastertronic games